Kushalovo is a rural locality (a village) in Pokrovskoye Rural Settlement, Velikoustyugsky District, Vologda Oblast, Russia. The population was 28 as of 2002. There are 2 streets.

Geography 
Kushalovo is located 51 km southeast of Veliky Ustyug (the district's administrative centre) by road. Pervomayskoye is the nearest rural locality.

References 

Rural localities in Velikoustyugsky District